Limnesiidae is a family of prostigs in the order Trombidiformes. There are at least 3 genera and 20 described species in Limnesiidae.

Genera
 Centrolimnesia Lundblad, 1935
 Limnesia C. L. Koch, 1836
 Tyrrellia Koenike, 1895

References

Further reading

 
 
 
 

Trombidiformes
Acari families